This article lists important figures and events in Malaysian public affairs during the year 1964, together with births and deaths of significant Malaysians.

Incumbent political figures

Federal level
Yang di-Pertuan Agong: Tuanku Syed Putra of Perlis
Raja Permaisuri Agong: Tengku Budriah of Perlis
Prime Minister: Tunku Abdul Rahman Putra Al-Haj
Deputy Prime Minister: Datuk Abdul Razak
Lord President: James Beveridge Thomson

State level
  Sultan of Johor: Sultan Ismail
  Sultan of Kedah: Sultan Abdul Halim Muadzam Shah
  Sultan of Kelantan: Sultan Yahya Petra
  Raja of Perlis: Tuanku Syed Sirajuddin (Regent)
  Sultan of Perak: Sultan Idris Shah II
  Sultan of Pahang: Sultan Abu Bakar
  Sultan of Selangor: Sultan Salahuddin Abdul Aziz Shah
  Sultan of Terengganu: Sultan Ismail Nasiruddin Shah (Deputy Yang di-Pertuan Agong)
  Yang di-Pertuan Besar of Negeri Sembilan: Tuanku Munawir
  Yang di-Pertua Negeri (Governor) of Penang: Tun Raja Uda
  Yang di-Pertua Negeri (Governor) of Malacca: Tun Haji Abdul Malek bin Yusuf
  Yang di-Pertua Negeri (Governor) of Sarawak: Tun Abang Haji Openg
  Yang di-Pertua Negeri (Governor) of Sabah: Tun Datu Mustapha
  Yang di-Pertua Negeri (Governor) of Singapore: Tun Yusof Ishak

Events
February – Construction of the Pekeliling Flats commenced.
March – The 1964 General Elections.
July – Famous Malay film actor, director and songwriter, P. Ramlee and his wife Saloma were moved from Singapore to Kuala Lumpur.
21 July – The Singapore Race Riots.
16 September - Malaysia (1st Anniversary) 1964 - Setahun Di Malaysia
First Anniversary of Malaysia day Malaysia's Seyear Day
10 October – Eleanor Roosevelt was commemorated on a Malaysian stamp.
10–24 October – Malaysia competed at the 1964 Summer Olympics in Rome, Italy. 62 competitors took part in ten sports.

Births
2 January – Noriah Kasnon, politician (died 2016) 
15 April – Bob Lokman – actor, comedian and lyricist
30 April – Tony Fernandes – Malaysian entrepreneur and the founder of Tune Air Sdn. Bhd (Air Asia)
5 July – Lee Ee Hoe, businessman 
8 July – Rodziah Ismail, politician
Unknown date – Normala Samsudin – former TV3 newscaster and personality
Unknown date – Azhar Idrus – Malaysian Islamic preacher and lecturer

Deaths
6 May – Zulkifli Muhammad – Former Deputy President of the Malaysian Islamic Party and MP of Bachok (1959-1964)

See also
 1964
 1963 in Malaysia | 1965 in Malaysia
 History of Malaysia

 
Years of the 20th century in Malaysia
Malaysia
Malaysia